Abdiaziz Hussein Hassan also known as Taarwale is a Somali politician. He served as the Mayor of Las Anod, the capital and the largest city of Sool region of Somaliland, from 16 January 2017 to 20 June 2021, where he was succeeded by Abdirahim Ali Ismail.

See also

 Mayor of Las Anod
 Las Anod

References

Living people
People from Las Anod
Mayors of places in Somaliland
Somaliland politicians
Year of birth missing (living people)